This is a list of military administrators, commissioners, governors and governors-general of Uganda.

The governor of Uganda was ultimately replaced by a president of Uganda after a brief transition to a governor-general.

Military administrator, 1890–1892 
 Frederick John Dealtry Lugard (b. 1858 – d. 1945) 26 December 1890 – May 1892

Commissioners, 1893–1910 
 Sir Gerald Herbert Portal (b. 1858 – d. 1897):  1 April 1893 – 30 May 1893
 James Ronald Leslie MacDonald (b. 1862 – d. 1927):  30 May 1893 –  4 November 1893 (acting) 
 Sir Henry Edward Colville (b. 1852 – d. 1907): 4 November 1893 – 10 May 1894                         
 Frederick Jackson: 10 May 1894 – 24 August 1894 (acting) 

 George Wilson CB (b. 1862 – d. 1943):  Dec 1894 (civil charge), 31 July 1895 (sub), 5 November 1897 - 29 January 1898 (acting and consul-general), 1 April 1902 - 1904 (deputy and vice-consul general), 1904-1907 (Acting Commissioner, HM Commander-in-Chief and Consul-General) 

 Ernest James Berkeley (b. 1857 – d. 1932): 24 August 1894 – December 1899
 Sir Harry Hamilton Johnston (b. 1858 – d. 1927): December 1899 – November 1901                  
 Sir James Hayes Sadler (b. 1851 – d. 1910): 1 January 1902 – 20 November 1907 (Commissioner, Commander-in-Chief and Consul-General)
 Sir Henry Hesketh Joudou Bell (b. 1864 – d. 1952): 20 November 1907 – 31 January 1910
 Sir Harry Edward Spiller Cordeaux (b. 1870 – d. 1943): 1 Feb 1910 – 18 Oct 1910

Governors of Uganda, 1910–1962
 Sir Harry Cordeaux: 1910–1911 (also Commissioner in early 1910)
 Sir Frederick Jackson: 1911–1918
 Sir Robert Coryndon: 1918–1922
 Sir Geoffrey Archer: 1922–1925
 Sir William Gowers: 1925–1932
 Sir Bernard Henry Bourdillon: 1932–1935
 Sir Philip Mitchell: 1935–1940
 Sir Charles Dundas: 1940–1945
 Sir John Hathorn Hall: 1945–1952
 Sir Andrew Cohen: 1952–1957
 Sir Frederick Crawford: 1957–1961
 Sir Walter Coutts: 1961–1962 (also Governor-General until 1963)

Governor-General of Uganda, 1962–1963
 Sir Walter Coutts: 9 October 1962 – 9 October 1963

See also
 President of Uganda
 Prime Minister of Uganda
 Lists of office-holders

References

Government of Uganda
History of Uganda
Uganda, List of governors of
Governors